Kiel Auditorium was an indoor arena located in St. Louis, Missouri. It was the home of the St. Louis University basketball team and hosted the NBA's St. Louis Hawks, from 1955 to 1968.

The site was home to Charles H. Turpin's Booker T. Washington Theater where performers included his brother Tom Turpin. The new municipal arena that replaced it was completed in 1934, at a cost of $6 million, seated 9,300 and was built by Fruin-Colnon Construction.  It was originally named the Municipal Auditorium, but was renamed in honor of former St. Louis Mayor Henry Kiel in 1943. A unique feature of the auditorium was that it was split into two; the front of the building was the Kiel Opera House. It was possible to use both sides at once as the stages were back to back. President Harry Truman gave a speech there in which both sides were opened to see his speech.

The Kiel Auditorium replaced the St. Louis Coliseum as the city's main indoor arena.

In 1955, the auditorium was also the venue for the second international conference of Alcoholics Anonymous, which established the service conference structure for the movement.

Kiel Auditorium played host to a variety of concerts and wrestling events, from the 1950s, until its closure in 1991. In 1983, it was the host of the Miss Universe Pageant. From the 1950s until the 1970s, the Kiel Auditorium was behind only Madison Square Garden as North America's most famous wrestling arena, hosting three NWA World Heavyweight Championship title changes from 1959 until 1986. The most notable wrestling event that took place at the Kiel Auditorium was WCW's premier event, Starrcade 1990. The building was demolished in 1992, but not before hosting the Missouri Valley Conference men's basketball tournament the preceding year.

After its demolition, its games and concerts temporarily went to the St. Louis Arena.

The Enterprise Center (originally named "Kiel Center", then "Savvis Center", then "Scottrade Center", before the current naming rights were purchased) now stands on the site of the former Kiel Auditorium. The Opera House portion of the building, on the northern part of the property, facing Market Street, was not torn down. It remained vacant for a while, but was renovated and reopened under the name Peabody Opera House in 2011. It is now known as the Stifel Theatre.

References

External links

1934 establishments in Missouri
1991 disestablishments in Missouri
Basketball venues in St. Louis
Defunct boxing venues in the United States
Sports venues demolished in 1992
Defunct college basketball venues in the United States
Defunct indoor arenas in the United States
Former National Basketball Association venues
Demolished music venues in the United States
Demolished sports venues in Missouri
Saint Louis Billikens basketball venues
Sports venues completed in 1934
Atlanta Hawks venues
Demolished buildings and structures in St. Louis